World Cancer Research Fund UK (WCRF UK) is a cancer prevention charity in the UK and is part of the World Cancer Research Fund network.

WCRF UK funds scientific research into how diet, physical activity and weight affect cancer risk and also funds health information programmes to raise awareness so people can reduce their cancer risk by eating a healthy diet, being physically active and maintaining a healthy weight. Its stated vision is to live in a world where no one develops a preventable cancer.

History

WCRF UK was established in 1990. According to its website, it was the first cancer charity in the UK to create awareness of the relationship between diet and cancer risk, to focus funding on research into diet and cancer prevention and to consolidate and interpret global research to create practical messages on reducing risk of cancer.

First Expert Report, Food, Nutrition and the Prevention of Cancer: a Global perspective expert report was published in 1997 and examined all the available evidence on the links between cancer and diet. According to WCRF International’s website, the report was a “catalyst for change” in stimulating research into diet and cancer.

Second Expert Report: In November 2007, the WCRF global network published Food, Nutrition, Physical Activity and the Prevention of Cancer: a Global Perspective. Also known as the Second Expert Report. WCRF claims the report is the most comprehensive about cancer prevention to date. Following an initial sweep of half a million research studies eventually, 7,000 were deemed relevant and met the quality criteria for definitive conclusions to be drawn about cancer prevention. A panel of 21 experts then made 10 recommendations for reducing cancer risk.

The launch of the Second Expert Report was a big news story in the UK. The report was described by the New Scientist magazine as a “landmark in our understanding of diet and cancer” while The Economist said: “It is the most rigorous study so far on the links between food, physical activity and cancer”.

Project Director of the report Professor Martin Wiseman said: “Our recommendations are based on the best science available. They are recommendations, not commandments. The whole point of them is to give people the information they need to make their everyday choices informed ones.”

Policy Report: In February 2009, the WCRF global network published Policy and Action for Cancer Prevention, a companion document to the Second Expert Report. It included 48 recommendations for changes that different groups in society can make to help prevent cancer. It also included a preventability study that estimated that a third of the most common cancers in the UK could be prevented through diet, physical activity and weight management.

Research
WCRF UK spends about £6.2 million per year on scientific research, health policy and education programmes.

WCRF International manages and administers the research programme on behalf of WCRF UK. UK researchers can apply for Investigator Initiated grants for a maximum of £250,000 for up to four years or for Seed grants for a maximum of £60,000 for two years.

WCRF UK also works with Imperial College London on its Continuous Update Project. This is a process designed to keep the evidence on diet and cancer current as new evidence emerges.

Health Information programmes
WCRF UK's Great Grub Club programme is aimed at four to seven-year-olds and their parents. According to its website, its aim is to encourage healthy eating and an active lifestyle in a fun and informative way.

WCRF UK produces publications that aim to translate scientific research into language that is easy to understand, providing information about the links between lifestyle and cancer and advice on how to make healthy changes.

A newsletter for supporters is published four times a year that includes information about scientific findings and gives practical advice about making healthy lifestyle changes.

WCRF UK provides information for health professionals to help them educate their patients. This includes publishing Informed, a newsletter aimed at health professionals. There is also a specific section for health professionals on the WCRF UK website.

Fundraising
Most of WCRF UK’s income is from the general public. It raises money in a range of ways from single donations, regular donations, running events and gifts left in wills.

See also 
 American Institute for Cancer Research
 Cancer in the United Kingdom

References

External links
 Official website

Cancer organisations based in the United Kingdom
Cancer research
1990 establishments in the United Kingdom
Organizations established in 1990